Smithfield may refer to:

Places

Australia

Electoral district of Smithfield, a former electoral district of the New South Wales Legislative Assembly
Smithfield, New South Wales, a suburb of Sydney
Smithfield, Queensland, a northern suburb of Cairns
Smithfield, South Australia, a northern suburb of Adelaide
Smithfield railway station, Adelaide
Smithfield Memorial Park, in Evanston South, South Australia
Smithfield State High School

Canada
Smithfield, Toronto, a neighbourhood of Toronto

Hong Kong
Smithfield, Hong Kong, a road

Ireland
Smithfield, Dublin

New Zealand
 Smithfield, New Zealand, industrial suburb of Timaru

South Africa
Smithfield, Free State

South America
Smithfield, Suriname

United Kingdom
Smithfield, Cumbria
Smithfield, London (sometimes referred to as West Smithfield)
Smithfield Market
East Smithfield, London
Smithfield, Birmingham

United States
Smithfield, a city neighborhood in Ensley, Birmingham, Alabama 
Smithfield, Illinois
Smithfield, Indiana
Smithfield, Kentucky
Smithfield, Maine
Smithfield, Missouri
Smithfield, Nebraska
Smithfield, New York 
Smithfield, North Carolina
West Smithfield, North Carolina
Smithfield, Ohio
Smithfield, Pennsylvania
Smithfield Street Bridge
Smithfield, Rhode Island
Smithfield, Texas
Smithfield, Utah
Smithfield, Virginia
Smithfield (Blacksburg, Virginia), listed on the NRHP in Montgomery County, Virginia
Smithfield (Rosedale, Virginia), listed on the NRHP in Russell County, Virginia
Smithfield, West Virginia
Smithfield, the former name of Middleway, West Virginia
Smithfield Township (disambiguation), a number of townships
Smithfield, U.S. Virgin Islands

Other uses 
Smithfield (dog), a shaggy type of collie dog used for herding cattle
Smithfield ham, a type of country ham
Smithfield Foods, a meat processing company
"Smithfield", the Pentium D processor's first generation codename
Smithfield Plantation (disambiguation)
Smithfield's Chicken 'N Bar-B-Q